is a registered museum that opened in Abashiri, Hokkaidō, Japan in 1972, as the second art museum, and the  first such to be purpose-built, on the island. The collection relates to artists of the Okhotsk region and temporary exhibitions are also held.

See also
 Hokkaido Museum
 Abashiri City Folk Museum
 Abashiri Prison Museum

References

External links

 Abashiri City Museum of Art

Abashiri, Hokkaido
Museums in Hokkaido
Museums established in 1972
1972 establishments in Japan